Prophet's Prey is a 2015 American documentary directed and written by Amy J. Berg. The film follows Warren Jeffs, the president of the Fundamentalist Church of Jesus Christ of Latter-Day Saints, who is now running the religion from the confines of the Texas state prison, serving out a life sentence, for the rape of young girls. The film is an adaption of the 2011 book of the same name by Sam Brower, who also serves as a producer on the film. Ron Howard serves as an executive producer under his Imagine Entertainment banner.

The film had its world premiere at the Sundance Film Festival on January 26, 2015. It was released in a limited release on September 18, 2015, followed by broadcast on Showtime on October 10, 2015.

Background
Berg was approached by Sam Brower and Jon Krakauer with the idea for the film.
Both Brower and Krakauer are heavily featured as witnesses—the film argues they played a major role in Jeffs's capture—and the men take consulting producer and executive producer credits respectively. The two make engaging if contrasting guides through the complex story, with Krakauer coming across as the wisecracking, cerebral counterpoint to Brower's burly man-of-action.

Release
The film had its world premiere at the Sundance Film Festival on January 26, 2015. It also screened at AFI Docs on June 18, 2015. The film was released in a limited release on September 18, 2015, followed by a broadcast on Showtime on October 10, 2015.

Reception

Critical reception
Prophet's Prey received positive reviews from film critics. It holds a 93% approval rating on review aggregator website Rotten Tomatoes, based on 27 reviews, with a weighted average of 7.00/10. The site's critical consensus reads, "Prophet's Prey finds documentarian Amy Berg striking again at evil masquerading as righteousness -- and, as she did with Deliver Us from Evil, hitting her targets with impressive precision."  On Metacritic, the film holds a rating of 77 out of 100, based on 15 critics, indicating "generally favorable reviews".

Awards
 Writers Guild of America Award for Best Documentary Screenplay - Nominated

See also
 Sons of Perdition

References

External links

2015 documentary films
2015 films
American documentary films
Documentary films critical of the Fundamentalist Church of Jesus Christ of Latter-Day Saints
Films directed by Amy J. Berg
Films scored by Nick Cave
Films scored by Warren Ellis (musician)
Showtime (TV network) documentary films
Imagine Entertainment films
2010s English-language films
2010s American films